Golestan-e Emamzadeh Jafar (also Romanized as Golestān-e Emāmzādeh Jaʿfar; also known as Golestān) is a village in Emamzadeh Jafar Rural District, in the Central District of Gachsaran County, Kohgiluyeh and Boyer-Ahmad Province, Iran. At the 2006 census, its population was 26, in 6 families.

References 

Populated places in Gachsaran County